Jorge López may refer to:

Sports
 Jorge López (baseball) (born 1993), baseball player
 Jorge López (boxer), see Boxing at the 1988 Summer Olympics
 Jorge López (rower) (born 1943), Cuban Olympic rower
 Jorge López Caballero (born 1981), Colombian footballer
 Jorge López Malo (born 1957), Mexican footballer
 Jorge López Marco (born 1978), Spanish footballer, nicknamed Tote
 Jorge López Montaña (born 1978), Spanish former footballer
 Jorge López (born 1992), Ecuadorian footballer with Centro Deportivo Olmedo and Club Deportivo Municipal Cañar

Other
 Jorge López aka Giro (musician), Puerto Rican salsa and pop singer who was a member of boy band Los Chicos
  (born 1955), Cuban-Austrian composer
 Jorge López (physicist) (born 1955), physicist and educator
 Jorge López Orozco (born 1976), Mexican convicted murderer
 Jorge Julio López (1929–), Argentinian bricklayer who disappeared after testifying in trial against Dirty War criminal Miguel Etchecolatz
 Jorge Manuel López (1918–2006), bishop
 Jorge Rivera López (born 1934), Argentine actor
 Jorge Torres López (born 1954), Mexican politician
 Jorge López Pérez, Mexican suspected drug lord

See also